The Execution may refer to:
The Execution, a 1985 television movie starring Loretta Swit and Valerie Harper
The Execution, a song by Spoon from their 1998 album A Series of Sneaks

See also
 Execution (disambiguation)